The Battle of Sunja (or Aldi) was a battle between the Russian Empire and Chechen forces of Sheikh Mansur in 1785. The Russian troops under command of Colonel De Pieri were surrounded and defeated by the forces of Sheikh Mansur. De Pieri and 840 Russians and Cossacks were killed, with 162 more taken captive, several hundred injured and the remainder of the Russian forces fleeing through the woods, chased by Chechen fighters.

The state of affairs in the North Caucasus in the middle of 1785
To strengthen the influence of the Russian Empire in the Caucasus, the Azov-Mozdok fortified line was erected. In response, this was followed by the liberation movement of the highlanders of Chechnya and then the entire North Caucasus against the colonial policy of Russia, led by the first imam of the North Caucasus, Sheikh Mansur. The command of the Russian army decided to conduct a punitive expedition deep into Chechnya to suppress the uprising.

Start of the expedition
On July 6, 1785, the expeditionary detachment of Colonel De Pieri, consisting of the Astrakhan regiment, a battalion of the Kabardian regiment, two companies of the Tomsk regiment and hundreds of Cossacks of the Terek army, from the side of the Kalinovskaya village headed for the flat village of Alda, where the main forces of Sheikh Mansur were located.

Coming closer, De Pieri found out that the inhabitants had left the village and ordered the soldiers to burn it down. Having destroyed the village, the troops began to retreat to the crossing over the Sunzha.

Battle

The column moved back, but as soon as it entered the gorge, it was surrounded on all sides by the troops of Mansur, who were covered by a small forest. The highlanders, not feeling much damage, hit the detachment with well-aimed shots. As soon as Pieri's detachment reached the thick of the forest and went deep into it, the battle began. Aldyns, together with the inhabitants of neighboring villages who came to their aid, attacked Pieri's detachment. The troops, squeezed from both sides, were surrounded. On the way of movement of the detachment, the highlanders in several places were arranged blockages of trees. Under crossfire, at the cost of heavy losses and fighting, they continued to move towards the crossing through Sunzha. The column, having passed the first verst through the forest, has already lost most of the rear guard. After repeated attempts to recapture the cannon they had taken from the enemy, Captain Kazin and several soldiers went ahead of the column and began to protect the front cannon. Nevertheless, the horses that carried the shells and dragged the second gun were killed. Kabardians (Kabardinsky 80th Infantry Regiment) were forced to simultaneously fight off the highlanders, carry boxes of shells and pull the gun. At the same time, the highlanders pressed on from the flanks with an onslaught crashed into the ranks of the side chains. “Despite this, the detachment moved forward, but when they approached the place where the reserve was left to protect the passage, a terrible picture appeared before them - all the soldiers and officers were killed. Under this unexpected circumstance, the troops became confused and at the same moment the highlanders rushed at them with renewed vigor from all sides, where a fierce battle ensued, the side chains were crushed and overturned by a mass of highlanders. The column was cut into two parts, among the retreating began a panic.

The remaining small part of the detachment with heavy losses went to the crossing. Having reached Sunzha, the remnants of the troops began to hastily cross to the other side of the coast. The mountaineers chasing them were already shooting at the soldiers who were crossing the river.

The rangers and a small number of Cossacks who broke through Chechens near Sunzha were supposed to wait for the detachment left there to guard the crossing, but they did not find either the detachment left there or the ships for the crossing. The commander of this detachment, having heard cannon shots in Aldy and wishing to be involved in a favorable, in his opinion, victory, went to connect with Pieri; but, having stumbled upon the dead bodies of the soldiers left in the narrow passage, he was so frightened that, having hastily fled back, he crossed to the left bank of the Sunzha, having destroyed the kayuk and left for the Terek. This commander was V. S. Tomar, who later held the important post of Russian envoy to Constantinople.

Effects
Pieri's detachment lost thirteen officers and seven hundred and forty men of the lower ranks. 162 people were captured by the highlanders. Among them was the young Prince P. I. Bagration, later a hero of the Patriotic War of 1812. “This defeat of the army greatly raised the authority of Mansur in the eyes of the highlanders. The success of the troops of Sheikh Mansur quickly spread to the Kuban and Kabarda, after the uprising covered a significant area.

Memory
A. P. Ermolov, in a letter to the general on duty under the emperor Arseny Zakrevsky, mentions the construction of fortifications along the Sunzha line:

See also
Battle of Khankala (1807)

References

Further reading
A. V. Potto "Caucasian War" (in 5 volumes) Volume 1.
The Russian conquest of the Caucasus, John Frederick Baddeley, 1908
Zisserman A. L. History of the 80th Kabardian Infantry Field Marshal Prince Baryatinsky Regiment. (1726-1880). T. 1-3. SPb., 1881.

Sunja
the Sunja
the Sunja
History of Chechnya
1785 in the Russian Empire